

This is an incomplete list of Acts of the Parliament of Ireland for the years until 1700.  See also the List of Acts of the Parliament of Ireland, 1701–1800.

The number shown by each Act's title is its chapter number. Acts are cited using this number, preceded by the year(s) of the reign during which the relevant parliamentary session was held; thus the Act concerning assay passed in 1783 is cited as "23 & 24 Geo. 3 c. 23", meaning the 23rd Act passed during the session that started in the 23rd year of the reign of George III and which finished in the 24th year of that reign.  Note that the modern convention is to use Arabic numerals in citations (thus "40 Geo. 3" rather than "40 Geo. III").  Acts of the reign of Elizabeth I are formally cited without a regnal numeral in the Republic of Ireland.

Acts passed by the Parliament of Ireland did not have a short title; however, some of these Acts have subsequently been given a short title by Acts of the Parliament of the United Kingdom, Acts of the Parliament of Northern Ireland, or Acts of the Oireachtas.  This means that some Acts have different short titles in the Republic of Ireland and Northern Ireland respectively.

A number of the Acts included in this list are still in force in Northern Ireland or the Republic of Ireland.  Because these two jurisdictions are entirely separate, the version of an Act in force in one may differ from the version in force in the other; similarly, an Act may have been repealed in one but not in the other.

A number of Acts passed by the Parliament of England also extended to Ireland during this period.

13th century

1 Hen. 3 (1216)
Great Charter of Ireland 1216

11 Hen. 3 (1226)
Curtesy Act 1226

20 Hen. 3 (1236)
Observance in Ireland of Statute of Merton

21 Hen. 3 (1237)
Concerning those born before wedlock

22 Hen. 3 (1238)
Inheritance of bastard

12 Edw. 1 (1284)
Observance in Ireland of Statute of Rutland

13 Edw. 1 (1285)
Observance in Ireland of Statute of Westminster I and Statute of Gloucester
Observance in Ireland of Statute of Westminster II

20 Edw. 1 (1292)
City of Limerick Act 1292

21 Edw. 1 (1293)
Sheriffs Act 1293

28 Edw. 1 (1300)
Custom of Ireland as to goods of testator
Export of silver

14th century

1 Edw. 2 (1307)
Observance in Ireland of Statute of Winchester

13 Edw. 2 (1320)
Confirmation of observance in Ireland of Statutes of Merton, Marlborough, Westminster the First, Westminster the Second, Gloucester

17 Edw. 2 (1324)
Observance in Ireland of Statute of Lincoln
Observance in Ireland of Statute of York

29 Edw. 3 (1355)
Forestallers of Fish

31 Edw. 3 (1357)
State of the Land of Ireland

40 Edw. 3 (1366)
Statute of Kilkenny

13 Ric. 2 (1389)
Prohibition of sale of falcons, hawks, etc.

15 Ric. 2 (1391)
Observance in Ireland of Statutes of England

15th century

3 Hen. 4 (1402)
Forcible Entry

11 Hen. 4 (1410)
Election of sheriffs: confirmation of rights
False Imprisonment Act 1410

7 Hen. 6 (1428)
c. 8 Indictments and Pleadings Act 1428

16 Hen. 6 (1437)
Treatment of Foreign Merchants Act 1437

33 Hen. 6
c. 9 Ships guarding the sea between Ireland and England to have certain tolls

37 Hen. 6 (1459)
c. 1 Warrants and Patents

38 Hen. 6
c. 14 Foreign enemies spoil and slay merchants, &c., on sea

3 Edw. 4 (1463)
c. 9 Town of Dungarvan Act 1463
c. 21 Town of Youghal Act 1463

5 Edw. 4 (1465)
City of Cork Act 1465

7 Edw. 4 (1467)
c. 2 An Act that none shall purchase Benefices from Rome

7 & 8 Edw. 4 (1467)
c. 58 Borough of Drogheda Act 1467
c. 64 Borough of Drogheda (No. 2) Act 1467

10 Edw. 4 (1470)
c. 10 Herring Fishery Act 1470

11 & 12 Edw. 4 (1471)
c. 80 Parliamentary Privilege Act 1471

15 & 16 Edw. 4 (1475)
c. 8 Taking of Pledges Act 1475

16 & 17 Edw. 4 (1476)
c. 17 County of Louth Act 1476
c. 22 Courts Act 1476

18 Edw. 4 (1478)
Confirmation of rights: pestilence
Saint Werburgh's Church Act 1478

18 Edw. 4 Sess. 1 (1478)
c. 8 Bog of Allen Act 1478

21 Edw. 4 (1481)
Christ Church Lands Act 1481

21 & 22 Edw. 4 (1481)
Christ Church Grants Act 1481
Town of Ardee Act 1481

1 & 2 Hen. 7 (1486)
c. 4 City of Dublin Act 1486
c. 5 Borough of Drogheda Act 1486

9 Hen. 7 (1493)
Distress etc. Act 1493

10 Hen. 7 (1495)
c. 4  Poynings' Law (on certification of acts)
c. 22 Poynings' Law (confirmation of English statutes) ("Poynings' Act 1495" in the UK, where it is still in force)

16th century

8 & 9 Hen. 8

c. 9 Foreigners fishing off coast to land one-third of the catch in Ireland

28 Hen. 8 (1537)

c. 2 Marriage Act 1537
c. 5 An Act authorising the King, His Heirs and Successors, to be supreme Head of the Church of Ireland
c. 7 Treason Act (Ireland) 1537
c. 18 Administration of Estates Act 1537
c. 22 Inland Navigation Act 1537

28 & 29 Hen. 8

c. 17 Marriage (No. 2) Act 1537 
c. 24 County of Wexford Act 1536
c. 32 Borough of Wexford Act 1536
c. 37 Boyne Weirs Act 1536

33 Hen. 8 (1542)

c. 1 Crown of Ireland Act 1542 (still in force in UK)
Mispleading and Jeoyfailes
c. 6 Marriage Act 1542
c. 10 Joint Tenants

33 Hen. 8 Sess. 2 (1542)

 c. 3 An Act touching Mispleading and Jeoyfailes

34 Hen. 8 (1543)

c. 1 Counties of Meath and Westmeath Act 1543

3 & 4 Phil. & Mar. (1556)

c. 2 Settlement of Laois and Offaly
c. 11 Treason Act
c. 14 Regal Power of Queen

2 Eliz. 1 (1560)

c. 1  (still in force in UK)
c. 2 An Act for the Uniformitie of Common Prayer and Service in the Church and the Administration of the Sacraments
c. 6 An Act whereby certaine Offences be made Treasons

12 Eliz. 1 (1570)

c. 1 An Act for the Erection of Free Schooles
c. 2 An Act that Exemplifications shall be of the same Effect and Strength as the Record or Matter exemplified should be

28 Eliz. 1 (1586)

c. 1 Perjury Act 1586
c. 2 Witchcraft Act 1586

17th century

1610-1619

11, 12 & 13 Jas. 1 (1613-15)
c. 2 Piracy Act 1613
c. 8

1630-1639

10 Chas. 1 (1634)

c. 3 An Act for confirming of letters patent hereafter to be past upon his Majesties commission of grace for the remedy of defective titles
c. 5 Recovery of rents by executors

10 Chas. 1 Sess. 2 (1634)

c. 1 Statute of Uses 1634
c. 3 Conveyancing Act 1634
c. 4 An Act concerning grantees of reversions, to take advantage of breaches of conditions &c.
c. 6 Trespass Act 1634
c. 14 An Act for the continuance of actions after the death of any King
c. 17 An Act that where the plaintiffe is non-suited, the defendant shall recover costs

10 Chas. 1 Sess. 3 (1634)

c. 2 Explanation of 10 Chas. 1 c. 3
c. 3 Re plantation
c. 7 An Act for contentation of debts upon execution
c. 10 Administration of Estates Act 1634
c. 13 Forcible Entry Act 1634
c. 15 Maintenance and Embracery Act 1634
c. 18 Sheriffs Act 1634

10 & 11 Chas. 1 (1634-35)

c. 3 Ecclesiastical Lands Act 1634
c. 8 An Act to give costs to the defendant, upon a nonsuite of the plaintiffe, or verdict against him
c. 10 An Act to prevent and punish the abuses in procuring processe and supersedeas of the peace and good behaviour out of his Majesties courts of Chancery and Kings Bench and to prevent abuses in procuring writs of certiorari, &c.
c. 11 Common Informers Act 1634
c. 12 Re privilege of Parliament
c. 35 Cruelty to horses and sheep

15 Chas. 1 Sess. 2 (1639)

c. 3 Forfeiture Act 1639 (still in force in UK)
c. 6 An Act for strengthening of letters patent past and to be past, upon any of his Majesties commissions of grace for the remedy of defective titles, etc.

1660-1669

14 & 15 Chas. 2 (1662)

c. 3 Hostlers and innkeepers

14 & 15 Chas. 2 Sess. 4 (1662)

c. 2 Re plantation
c. 10 An Act for real union and division of parishes, and concerning churches, free-schools and exchanges
c. 19 Tenures Abolition Act 1662
c. 21 An Act for increasing the fee of the seal due to the lord chancellor of Ireland

17 & 18 Chas. 2 (1665)

c. 2 Re plantation
c. 6 An Act for the Uniformity of Publique Prayers and Administration of Sacraments, and other Rites and Ceremonies; and for establishing the Forme of making, ordaining, and consecrating Bishops, Priests and Deacons, in the Church of Ireland
c. 11 An Act to prevent Delays in extending Statutes, Judgements and Recognizances
c. 20 An Act for the trial by Nisi Prius of Issues laid in the City of Dublin and County of Dublin
c. 21 St. Patrick's Cathedral Act 1665

1690-1700

4 Will. & Mar. (1692)

c. 1 An Act of Recognition, of their Majesties undoubted Right to the Crown of Ireland (still in force in UK)
c. 2 An Act for encouragement of Protestant strangers to settle in this kingdom of Ireland
c. 4 An Act for taking Affidavits in the Country, to be made use of in the Courts of King's Bench, Common Pleas and Exchequer

7 Will. 3 (1695)

c. 2 An Act for taking away the Writ de heretico comburendo
c. 3 An Act declaring all Attainders and all other Acts made in the late pretended Parliament, to be void
c. 4 An Act to Restrain foreign Education
c. 5 An Act for the better securing the government, by disarming papists
c. 6 Statute of Distribution 1695
c. 8 Life Estates Act 1695
c. 9 Profane Oaths Act 1695
c. 12 Statute of Frauds 1695
c. 13 Sheriffs Act 1695
c. 14 An Act declaring which days in the year shall be observed as holy-days
c. 15 An Act for granting a Supply to his Majesty, by raising Money by a Poll, and otherwise
c. 17 Sunday Observance Act 1695
c. 18 Bail in civil actions
c. 21 An Act for the better suppressing Tories, Robbers, and Rapparees; and for preventing Robberies, Burglaries, and other heinous Crimes
c. 22 Distress for Rent Act 1695

9 Will. 3 (1697)

c. 1 An Act for banishing all Papists exercising any Ecclesiastical Jurisdiction, and all Regulars of the Popish Clergy out of this Kingdom - known as the "Banishment Act"
c. 2 An Act for the Confirmation of Articles made at the Surrender of the City of Limerick
c. 3 An Act to prevent Protestants inter-marrying with Papists
c. 5 An Act to hinder the Reversal of several Outlawries and Attainders, and to prevent the Return of Subjects of this Kingdom who have gone into the Dominions of the French King in Europe
c. 8 An Act for granting a supply to his Majesty, by raising money by a poll
c. 9 An Act to Supply the Defects, and for better Execution of an Act passed this present Session of Parliament, entituled, An act for the better suppressing Tories and Rapparees; and for preventing Robberies, Burglaries, and other heinous Crimes
c. 10 Costs and prevention of frivolous suits
c. 11 Clandestine Mortgages Act 1697
c. 13 Transferring suits from inferior Courts
c. 16 St. Michan's Parish Act 1697

10 Will. 3 (1698)

c. 6 Glebe Act 1698
c. 7 Confirming estates under Acts of Settlement
c. 8 Deer Protection Act 1698
c. 10 An Act for traversing Inquisitions
c. 13 An Act to prevent Papists being Solicitors
c. 14 Arbitration

See also
List of Acts of the Oireachtas
List of Acts of Parliament of the United Kingdom Parliament

References
  - contains all Acts.
  - contains all Acts.
  - contains all Acts.
  - contains Acts in force when edition was published.
 
  (Index includes medieval "royal ordinances and similar documents that are recognised as having the force and effect of an Act of Parliament".)

Endnotes

1700